Next Stage Repertory Company is a professional-level acting company in Medford, Oregon, that is produced by Craterian Performances along with Teen Musical Theater of Oregon. Next Stage has put on plays such as Talley's Folly, The Glass Menagerie, and Molly Sweeney. Next Stage commonly produces four productions a year that star actors local to the Rogue Valley.

List of full productions

2011–2012 season
 Talley's Folly
 The Decorator
 The Wild Guys
 Molly Sweeney

2012–2013 season
 Three Viewings
 All in the Timing
 Duet for One
 Brilliant Traces

2013–2014 season
 The Glass Menagerie
 Old Time Traveling Radio Show
 Collected Stories
 The Spitfire Grill

References

Medford, Oregon
Theatre companies in Oregon
2011 establishments in Oregon